Monte Budellone is a mountain of Lombardy, Italy, It has an elevation of 258 metres.

Mountains of Lombardy